The Castle of Geraldo is a ruined medieval castle located in the civil parish of Nossa Senhora da Tourega e Nossa Senhora de Guadalupe, in the municipality of Évora, in the Portuguese district of Évora.

History
The site in Nossa Senhora da Tourega e Nossa Senhora de Guadalupe has been continuously occupied since 3000 B.C. and 1000 A.D. It was founded on a castro fortified proto-historic structure, with its origin in the Bronze Age, Chalcolithic, with vestiges from older settlements.

During the Middle Ages it was sporadically re-occupied and reconstructed. 

Records from the 15th century indicate that the castle was associated with Giraldo Sem Pavor, a warrior who conquered Évora from the Muslims in 1165.

Today the site is being analyzed for classification.

Architecture
It is a semi-circular construction occupied a  perimeter. The walls constructed on its perimeter were erected during the medieval period. From its walls it is possible to see the city of Évora and town of Valverde (Nossa Senhora da Tourega).

References 

Geraldo
Geraldo
Buildings and structures in Évora